Friedrich-Georg Eberhardt (15 January 1892 – 9 September 1964) was a German Generalleutnant who commanded several divisions during World War II. He was awarded the Knight's Cross of the Iron Cross.

History 
He commanded the 60th Infantry Division, 38th Infantry Division, 174th Reserve Division, and 286th Security Division.
He was sent four times to the Führerreserve.

In 1939, he commanded the German forces in one of the opening battles of World War II, the Battle of Westerplatte.

From December 1944 on, he was judge at the Reichskriegsgericht under Roland Freisler.

He was a recipient of the Knight's Cross of the Iron Cross, the highest award in the military and paramilitary forces of Nazi Germany during World War II.

Awards

 Knight's Cross of the Iron Cross on 31 December 1941 as Generalleutnant and commander of 60. Infanterie-Division

References

Citations

Bibliography

1892 births
1958 deaths
German Army personnel of World War I
German prisoners of war in World War II
Lieutenant generals of the German Army (Wehrmacht)
People from Alsace-Lorraine
Military personnel from Strasbourg
Recipients of the clasp to the Iron Cross, 1st class
Recipients of the Knight's Cross of the Iron Cross
German Army generals of World War II